Tyagaiah is a 1946 Telugu-language film produced and directed by V. Nagayya It is based on the life of the saint Tyagaraja.

Cast

Male cast
 V. Nagayya as Tyagaiah
 Lingamurthy as Japesam
 Nyapathi Narayana Moorthi  as King Sharabhoji
 Rayaprolu Subrahmanyam as Venkataramana Bhagavatulu
 K. Doraiswamy as Sundaresa Mudaliar
 M. C. Raghavan as Marthanda Bhagavatar
 Natesam as Bobbili Kesavaiah
 K. V. Subba Rao as Dhanapala Chetti
 Prayaga Narasimha Sastry as Ganapati (Sishya)
 Aswatdhama as Ramudu
 Narayana Rao as Commander-in-Chief
 Vedantam Lakshmikantam as Narada-in disguise 
 Kumpatla Subba Rao as Kuchipudi - Bhagavatulu
 A. L. Narayana as Kuchipudi - Bhagavatulu
 Appalacharyulu as Kuchipudi - Bhagavatulu
 G. Venkataswami Raju as Shishya

Female cast
 B. Jayamma as Dharmamba
 Sarita Devi as Chapala
 C. Hemalatha Devi as Kamalamba 
 Sundaralakshmi as Seethalakshmi
 Jayavanti as Court Singer
 G. Visweswaramma as Venkamma
 Baby T. Shyamala as Radha
 Baby Vanaja as Krishna

Production
The film was jointly produced by Nagayya and Sri Duvvuri Narayana Reddy, and directed by V. Nagayya. Nagayya also wrote the story and handled the scenario. The dialogues were written by S. V. R. Acharya i.e., Samudrala Venkata Raghavacharya otherwise popularly known as Samudrala Sr. Photography and special effects were handled by Mohamed A. Rehman. Audiography was done by Dinshaw K. Tehrani, editing by Govind Dinkar Joshi, and art by C. Rama Raju and F. Nagoor. The dances were choreographed by Vedantam Raghavayya.

Music
The music was composed by V. Nagayya and the Renuka Orchestra headed by the Trivellore Violinist Brothers. While the lyrics of most of 37 songs were written by S. V. R. Acharya (Samudrala Sr.), the Tamil songs were written by Papanasam Sivan and Chandilyan. One Hindi song was written by J. A. Rehman. Nagayya had introduced lyrics in Kannada with the song Purandaradasa Devara Nama (film credits). Songs in Tamil and Hindi were sung by D. K. Pattammal and J. A. Rehman respectively.

See also
 Tyagayya (1981 film)

References

External links
 Thyagaiah at IMDB
 Thyagaiah songs at Musicindia.
 Thyagaiah review at Idle brain.
 Thyagaiah film review at Roopavani in Telugu.
 

1946 films
1940s Telugu-language films
Indian biographical films
Films about classical music and musicians
Indian black-and-white films

te:త్యాగయ్య (1946 సినిమా)